Àlex Monner Zubizarreta (born 27 January 1995) is a Spanish actor. He is known for his role as Lleó in the Catalan television series Polseres vermelles.

Monner was born in Barcelona. He debuted in Pau Freixa's film Herois, and then had a television role in the TV3 series Polseres vermelles, scripted by Albert Espinosa and again directed by Freixa.  He played Lleó, a young man who lost a leg because of cancer.

In 2012, he featured in REC 3: Génesis as Adrián.

He has collaborated with Freixas several times in recent years, in the Telecinco series Sé quién eres, the first Spanish drama to be shown on the BBC, and in Cites, the Catalan version of the British series Dates.

He has appeared in roles on Televisió de Catalunya, TNT, Antena 3, the Telefe channel of Argentina, and Monte Carlo TV of Uruguay.

Filmography

Feature films

Television

Theatre 

 Jo mai, of Iván Morales. Dir.: Iván Morales. Festival Grec (2013). Teatre Lliure (2014)

Awards and nominations 
Goya Awards

 Spanish Movies Festival of Málaga: Biznaga of Silver to the best cast actor because of Los niños salvajes (2012).
 Gaudí Awards Winner the best revelation actor Els nens salvatges (2013)
 Fotogramas Awards Winner the best TV actor for his role as Lléo in Polseres Vermelles (2013)
 Turia Awards Winner the best revelation actor Els nens salvatges (2013)
 Cinematographic Writers' Circle CEC Awards Nominated to the best revelation actor Els nens salvatges (2013)

References

 http://www.elperiodico.cat/ca/noticias/tele/20110207/alex-monner-quan-vaig-arribar-casa-rapat-meva-mare-plorar/694120.shtml
 https://www.imdb.com/name/nm3856284/
 http://www.antena3.com/series/pulseras-rojas/noticias/descubriendo-alex-monner-joven-promesa-cine-television_2012071200067.html

External links 
 

Male actors from Barcelona
1995 births
Living people
21st-century Spanish male actors
Catalan television actors
Male film actors from Catalonia